Eschweilera longirachis is a species of woody plant in the Lecythidaceae family. It is found in Costa Rica and Panama.

References

Sources

longirachis
Flora of Costa Rica
Flora of Panama
Data deficient plants
Taxonomy articles created by Polbot